LGA 1151, also known as Socket H4, is a type of zero insertion force flip-chip land grid array (LGA) socket for Intel desktop processors which comes in two distinct versions: the first revision which supports both Intel's Skylake and Kaby Lake CPUs, and the second revision which supports Coffee Lake CPUs exclusively.

LGA 1151 is designed as a replacement for the LGA 1150 (known as Socket H3). LGA 1151 has 1151 protruding pins to make contact with the pads on the processor. The Fully Integrated Voltage Regulator, i.e. a voltage regulator which integrated on the CPU's die, introduced with Haswell and Broadwell, has again been moved to the motherboard.

Most motherboards for the first revision of the socket support solely DDR4 memory, a lesser number support DDR3(L) memory, and the least number have slots for both DDR4 or DDR3(L) but only one memory type can be installed. Some have UniDIMM support, enabling either type of memory to be placed in the same DIMM, rather than having separate DDR3 and DDR4 DIMMs. The second revision socket motherboards support only DDR4 memory.

Skylake, Kaby Lake, and Coffee Lake chipsets support VT-d, Intel Rapid Storage Technology, Intel Clear Video Technology, and Intel Wireless Display Technology (an appropriate CPU is required). Most motherboards with the LGA 1151 socket support varying video outputs (DVI, HDMI 1.4 or DisplayPort 1.2 –  depending on the model). VGA output is optional since Intel dropped support for this video interface starting with Skylake. HDMI 2.0 (4K@60 Hz) is only supported on motherboards equipped with Intel's Alpine Ridge Thunderbolt controller.

Skylake, Kaby Lake, and Coffee Lake chipsets do not support the legacy conventional PCI interface; however, motherboard vendors may implement it using external chips.

Heatsink 
The 4 holes for fastening the heatsink to the motherboard are placed in a square with a lateral length of 75 mm for Intel's sockets LGA 1156, LGA 1155, LGA 1150, LGA 1151 and LGA 1200. Cooling solutions should therefore be interchangeable.

LGA 1151 revision 1

DDR3 memory support 
Intel officially states that Skylake's and Kaby Lake's integrated memory controllers (IMC) support DDR3L memory modules only rated at 1.35 V and DDR4 at 1.2 V, which led to the speculation that higher voltages of DDR3 modules could damage or destroy the IMC and processor. Meanwhile, ASRock, Gigabyte, and Asus guarantee that their Skylake and Kaby Lake DDR3 motherboards support DDR3 modules rated at 1.5 and 1.65V.

Skylake chipsets (100 series and C230 series)

Kaby Lake chipsets (200 series) 

There is no equivalent Kaby Lake chipset analogous to the H110 chipset. Four additional PCH PCI-E lanes in Kaby Lake chipsets are reserved for implementing an M.2 slot to support Intel Optane Memory. Otherwise, corresponding Kaby Lake and Skylake chipsets are practically the same.

Light blue indicates a difference between comparable Skylake and Kaby Lake chipsets.

LGA 1151 revision 2

Second revision of the LGA 1151 socket for Coffee Lake CPUs 
The LGA 1151 socket was revised for the Coffee Lake generation CPUs and comes along with the Intel 300-series chipsets. While physical dimensions remain unchanged, the updated socket reassigns some reserved pins, adding power and ground lines to support the requirements of 6-core and 8-core CPUs. The new socket also relocates the processor detection pin, breaking compatibility with earlier processors and motherboards. As a result, desktop Coffee Lake CPUs are officially not compatible with the 100 (original Skylake) and 200 (Kaby Lake) series chipsets. Similarly, 300 series chipsets officially only support Coffee Lake and are not compatible with Skylake and Kaby Lake CPUs.

Socket 1151 rev 2 is sometimes also referred to as "1151-2".

Coffee Lake chipsets (300 series and C240 series) 
Like with Kaby Lake chipsets, four additional PCH PCI-E lanes in Coffee Lake chipsets are reserved for implementing an M.2 slot to support Intel Optane Memory.

There's a 22 nm version of H310 chipset, H310C, which is sold only in China. Motherboards based on this chipset support DDR3 memory as well.

** depends on OEM's implementation

See also 
 List of Intel microprocessors
 List of Intel chipsets

References 

Intel CPU sockets
Computer-related introductions in 2015